The Borde–Guth–Vilenkin theorem, or the BGV theorem, is a theorem in physical cosmology which deduces that any universe that has, on average, been expanding throughout its history cannot be infinite in the past but must have a past spacetime boundary. The theorem does not assume any specific mass content of the universe and it does not require gravity to be described by Einstein field equations. It is named after the authors Arvind Borde, Alan Guth and Alexander Vilenkin, who developed its mathematical formulation in 2003. The BGV theorem is also popular outside physics, especially in religious and philosophical debates.

Alternative models, where the average expansion of the universe throughout its history does not hold, have been proposed under the notions of emergent spacetime, eternal inflation, and  cyclic models. Vilenkin and Audrey Mithani have argued that none of these models escape the implications of the theorem. In 2017, Vilenkin stated that he does not think there are any viable cosmological models that escape the scenario. 

Theoretical cosmologist Sean M. Carroll argues that the theorem only applies to classical spacetime, and may not hold under consideration of a complete theory of quantum gravity. He added that Alan Guth, one of the co-authors of the theorem, disagrees with Vilenkin and believes that the universe had no beginning. Vilenkin argues that the Carroll-Chen model constructed by Carroll and Jennie Chen, and supported by Guth, to elude the BGV theorem’s conclusions persists to indicate a singularity in the history of the universe as it has a reversal of the arrow of time in the past.

See also
Kalam cosmological argument
Gibbons–Hawking–York boundary term

References

Further reading 

Physics theorems
Physical cosmology